The 1966 New York Yankees season was the 64th season for the Yankees. The team finished with a record of 70–89, finishing 26.5 games behind the Baltimore Orioles. New York was managed by Johnny Keane and Ralph Houk. The Yankees played at Yankee Stadium. Keane managed his final MLB game in early May, and died the following January at the age of 55.

The Yankees finished in 10th place, although arguably a "strong" tenth. It was the first time they had finished in last place since 1912, their last year at the Hilltop. The Yankees would not finish in last place again for another twenty four years.

On September 22, a paid attendance of 413 was announced at the 65,000-seat Yankee Stadium. WPIX announcer Red Barber asked the TV cameras to pan the empty stands as he commented on the low attendance. Although denied the camera shots on orders from the Yankees' head of media relations, he said, "I don't know what the paid attendance is today, but whatever it is, it is the smallest crowd in the history of Yankee Stadium, and this crowd is the story, not the game." By a horrible stroke of luck, that game was the first for CBS executive Mike Burke as team president. A week later, Barber was invited to breakfast where Burke told him that his contract would not be renewed.

Offseason 
 November 29, 1965: Rich Barry was drafted from the Yankees by the Philadelphia Phillies in the 1965 minor league draft.
 January 14, 1966: Doc Edwards was traded by the Yankees to the Cleveland Indians for Lou Clinton.
 January 29, 1966: Darrell Evans was drafted by the Yankees in the 2nd round of the 1966 Major League Baseball Draft (Secondary Phase), but did not sign.

Regular season

Season standings

Record vs. opponents

Notable transactions 
 May 3, 1966: Al Closter was purchased by the Yankees from the Washington Senators.
 June 7, 1966: Joe Pactwa was drafted by the Yankees in the 18th round of the 1966 Major League Baseball Draft.

Roster

Player stats

Batting

Starters by position 
Note: Pos = Position; G = Games played; AB = At bats; H = Hits; Avg. = Batting average; HR = Home runs; RBI = Runs batted in

Other batters 
Note: G = Games played; AB = At bats; H = Hits; Avg. = Batting average; HR = Home runs; RBI = Runs batted in

Pitching

Starting pitchers 
Note: G = Games pitched; IP = Innings pitched; W = Wins; L = Losses; ERA = Earned run average; SO = Strikeouts

Other pitchers 
Note: G = Games pitched; IP = Innings pitched; W = Wins; L = Losses; ERA = Earned run average; SO = Strikeouts

Relief pitchers 
Note: G = Games pitched; W = Wins; L = Losses; SV = Saves; ERA = Earned run average; SO = Strikeouts

Farm system 

LEAGUE CHAMPIONS: GCL Yankees

Notes

References 
1966 New York Yankees at Baseball Reference
1966 New York Yankees team page at www.baseball-almanac.com

New York Yankees seasons
New York Yankees
New York Yankees
1960s in the Bronx